The 1978–79 Elitserien season was the fourth season of the Elitserien, the top level of ice hockey in Sweden. 10 teams participated in the league, and MoDo AIK won the championship.

Standings

Playoffs

External links
 Swedish Hockey League official site

Swedish Hockey League seasons
1978–79 in Swedish ice hockey
Swedish